Nuuksio National Park is one of Finland's 40 national parks. Established in 1994, the park spreads over an area of forests and lakes in Espoo, Kirkkonummi and Vihti. North-west from Helsinki, it is the second-closest national park to the capital behind the recently established Sipoonkorpi National Park. The name is derived from the Nuuksio district of Espoo.

Located less than 30 kilometers from downtown Helsinki, the park can easily be reached by public transportation. Bus 245A leaves from Espoon keskus to Nuuksionpää and Kattila during daytime.

Within the park there are eight marked trails for hiking. These trails vary in length and difficulty, being between 1.5 km and 17 km long. In addition, there are 30 km of biking trails and 22 km of horse riding trails. Designated spots for grilling, camping and skiing are scattered across the park.

The Siberian flying squirrel (Pteromys volans) is the emblem of the national park due to their high population density in the park.

The national park comprises the westernmost part of the so-called Nuuksio lake highlands. Dozens of endangered or near threatened species animals, plants and fungi are known to inhabit the area, for instance the Siberian flying squirrel, the European nightjar and the woodlark.


See also
 Districts of Espoo
 List of national parks of Finland
 Sipoonkorpi National Park
 Protected areas of Finland

References

External links
 Nuuksio National Park – Finland, Naturally
 Nuuksio National Park – Natureparks.fi
 

Espoo
Protected areas established in 1994
Geography of Uusimaa
Tourist attractions in Uusimaa
National parks of Finland

cs:Nuuksio